Samuel Auchmuty may refer to:

Samuel Auchmuty (British Army officer) (1756–1822), British lieutenant-general and Commander-in-Chief, Ireland
Samuel Benjamin Auchmuty (1780–1868), Anglo-Irish general in India

See also
Samuel Auchmuty Dickson (1817–1870), Irish politician